Ljungby Municipality (Ljungby kommun) is a municipality in Kronoberg County, southern Sweden, where the town Ljungby is seat.

In 1971 the City of Ljungby (1936-1970) was amalgamated with the rural municipalities surrounding it, thus creating the present municipality. In 1974 a minor adjustment of the boundaries took place. There are 19 original entities within the area.

Geography
Ljungby Municipality contains a little more plains than average in Småland. Lakes, forests and plains are never far away. The tenth largest lake in Sweden, Bolmen, is located in the north-western part of the municipality. The town Ljungby is visited by thousands of tourists, mainly from Germany, every summer.

Localities
There are 8 urban areas (also called a tätort or locality) in Ljungby Municipality.

In the table the localities are listed according to the size of the population as of 31 December 2005. The municipal seat is in bold characters.

The small village of Bohok is also located within Ljungby Municipality.

History
Ljungby Municipality traces its history back to the Viking Age. Vikings followed the river Lagan and lived in its vicinity, and one of the locations were in what is now Ljungby Municipality.

In the 14th century several important medieval roads went through the municipality. In that century, an inn was established, and this was to form the center of Ljungby town.

During the 19th century the area closest to Ljungby itself consisted mostly of sand without any vegetation, and the government released funds to plant trees which would tie together the sand and make it suitable for plants.

Sister cities
The following cities are twinned with Ljungby: 
 Ås, Akershus fylke, Norway
 Paimio, Southwest Finland, Finland
 Šilutė, Klaipėda County, Lithuania

Notability

The opera singer Christina Nilsson was discovered while performing at the Ljungby market in 1857.
Metallica bassist Cliff Burton died on a highway within the municipality when the band's tour bus overturned on 27 September 1986.

Born here
Eskil Erlandsson born in Torpa 1957. Former chairman of the Swedish Defence Committee (2002-2006) and current Agriculture ministry(2006-).
John Lind, Governor of Minnesota (1899–1901), born in Kånna parish.
Olof Johansson (b. 1931), politician, former president of the Swedish Centre Party.
Peter Westerstrøm, mass murderer executed in Norway in 1809.

References

Statistics Sweden

External links

Ljungby Municipality - Official site

Municipalities of Kronoberg County